Ayumi Hamasaki Premium Countdown Live 2008–2009 A is Japanese pop singer Ayumi Hamasaki's 8th Countdown concert DVD. It was released on May 13, 2009. The DVD topped the Oricon Charts that week with less than 50,000 copies sold.

Track list
Disc 1
GREEN
Will
vogue
HONEY
ANGEL'S SONG
End of the World
Heartplace
Real me
MEDLEY – (And Then 〜 Naturally)
In The Corner
POWDER SNOW
HOPE or PAIN
Over
SCAR

Disc 2
MEDLEY – (SIGNAL 〜 Hana 〜 too late)
UNITE!
MEDLEY – (SURREAL, evolution, SURREAL)
Who...
Trauma
independent
everywhere nowhere
Mirrorcle World
Days
For My Dear...
+
flower garden
Boys & Girls
MY ALL

References

Ayumi Hamasaki video albums
2009 video albums
Live video albums
2009 live albums
Albums recorded at the Yoyogi National Gymnasium